Y la luna también is a Venezuelan telenovela created by César Miguel Rondón and produced by Venevisión in 1987.

Amanda Gutiérrez and Carlos Augusto Cestero star as protagonists alongside Ruddy Rodríguez and Luis José Santander. Herminia Martínez, Yolanda Méndez and Fernando Flores star as antagonists.

Plot
Lucía is an assistant working at a beauty parlor owned by Teresa Pastor, while Simón is a waiter in a modest restaurant, and they both become carried away  in fantasy to live lives which do not belong to them as they both pretend to come from rich backgrounds. Elena, Lucía's older sister, begins working for the Azcárate Consortium where she meets and falls in love with Claudio Miranda, without knowing that he is engaged to Cherry Azcárate, the daughter of the company's owner.

Cast
Amanda Gutiérrez as Elena Anselmi
Carlos Augusto Cestero as Claudio Miranda
Daniel López as Tarado Armando
Ruddy Rodríguez as Lucía Anselmi (Estefanía)
Luis José Santander as Simón Vargas
Eva Blanco as Teresa Pastor
Herminia Martínez as Cherry Azcárate Melchan
Fernando Flores as Ulises Azcárate
José Oliva as Vitelio Vargas
Yolanda Méndez as Federica Melchán de Azcárate
Betty Ruth as Doña Leticia Anselmi
Carlos Briceño as Ulises Jose Pepe Azcarate Melchan
Ramón Hinojosa as Pompilio Gomez
Ricardo Blanco as Dr. Emiliano Guzman
Lucy Otra as Teotiste
Gustavo Gonzalez as Don Urbano
Esther Orjuela as Eugenia De Corona
Zulma López as Kathy Azcarate Melchan
Yadira Santana as Catalina Aguirre
Laura Zerra as Doña Encarnacion
Carlos Salas

References

External links

1987 telenovelas
Venevisión telenovelas
Spanish-language telenovelas
1987 Venezuelan television series debuts
1987 Venezuelan television series endings
Venezuelan telenovelas
Television shows set in Venezuela